The Cape Bruny Lighthouse is an inactive lighthouse located at the southern tip of Bruny Island, Tasmania, Australia.

Features and location

It is the second oldest extant lighthouse tower in Australia, as well as having the longest (158 years) history of being continuously manned. It was first lit in March 1838 and was eventually decommissioned on 6 August 1996.

The project was commissioned by Governor George Arthur in 1835 after a series of shipwrecks south of Bruny Island and construction began in April 1836. The lighthouse was built by convict labour using locally quarried dolerite over two years. When first lit in March 1838 it was Tasmania's third lighthouse and Australia's fourth.

Cape Bruny was initially illuminated by a Wilkins lantern, consuming one pint of sperm whale oil per hour. In 1892, whale oil was replaced by better quality colza oil. In 1903 the original staircase was replaced with a cast-iron staircase and the Wilkins lantern replaced with a Chance Brothers lantern; both remain in the tower today. The lighthouse was converted to electricity only in 1959.

In December 2000 the light station area, including the lighthouse, became part of the South Bruny National Park. The lightstation was maintained by a permanent caretaker until 2011 when the Parks & Wildlife established a rotational volunteer caretaker program. Volunteers live on-site in the caretakers cottage for four-week periods, assisting with repairs and general maintenance.

In June 2012, the Tasmanian government sought expressions of interest from commercial operators wishing to take over the operation and management of the Cape Bruny Light Station. No tender was awarded and the site is managed by the Parks & Wildlife Service with assistance from volunteers. Following the tender process, only one company began tours of the South Bruny National Park and Cape Bruny Light Station that takes tourists to visit the Cape Bruny Lightstation, they also operate tours inside the lighthouse tower.

An active light tower is located nearby on a fiberglass construction of  height. Its light characteristic is "Fl. 10 s", i.e. a white flash every 10 seconds.

See also

 History of Tasmania
 List of lighthouses in Tasmania

References

External links
 Australian Maritime Safety Authority
 Cape Bruny Lighthouse Information - Lighthouses of Australia Inc
 Cape Bruny Lighthouse Information - Parks & Wildlife Service 
 Bruny Island Lighthouse Tours

Lighthouses completed in 1838
Southern Tasmania
Lighthouses in Tasmania
Tasmanian Heritage Register
Bruny Island
1838 establishments in Australia
1996 disestablishments in Australia
Disused lighthouses in Australia
South Bruny National Park